Cyrtodactylus uthaiensis, the Uthai Thani bent-toed gecko, is a species of gecko endemic to Thailand.

References

 http://reptile-database.reptarium.cz/species?genus=Cyrtodactylus&species=uthaiensis

Reptiles of Thailand
Cyrtodactylus
Reptiles described in 2022